Schillerplatz is a square in Innere Stadt, Vienna, Austria.

Innere Stadt
Squares in Vienna